Mohammad Reza Khalatbari may refer to:

 Mohammad Reza Khalatbari (footballer, born 1948), Iranian footballer
 Mohammad Reza Khalatbari (footballer, born 1983), Iranian footballer